The Men's 2014 USA National Championships Boxing 2014 were held in Spokane, USA from January 20 to January 25. It is the 124th edition of this annual competition.

Medal winners

External links 
 Full Results

2014 in boxing
United States national amateur boxing championships
2014 in sports in Washington (state)
USA National Championships Boxing 2014
Sports competitions in Washington (state)
Boxing in Washington (state)